Miyakea consimilis is a moth in the family Crambidae. It was described by Sasaki in 2012. It is found in Japan (Honshu).

References

Crambini
Moths described in 2012
Moths of Japan